Yusuf Uçar (born January 1, 1987, in Reyhanlı, Hatay Province, Turkey) is a Turkish national goalball player of class B1 and Paralympian.

Sporting career
A member of İstanbul Visually Impaired People Sports Club, Uçar played in Turkey's national team at the 2012 Summer Paralympics, which became bronze medalist.

Achievements

References

Living people
1987 births
People from Reyhanlı
Male goalball players
Turkish goalball players
Paralympic goalball players of Turkey
Goalball players at the 2012 Summer Paralympics
Visually impaired category Paralympic competitors
Turkish blind people
Paralympic bronze medalists for Turkey
Medalists at the 2012 Summer Paralympics
Paralympic medalists in goalball
Paralympic athletes with a vision impairment
21st-century Turkish people
Sportspeople from Hatay